Margaret I. McAllister is an English author of children's books, born in 1956.  She grew up on the north-east coast of England.  Her first book, A Friend for Rachel (now entitled The Secret Mice) was published by the Oxford University Press in 1997.  Urchin of the Riding Stars, the first in The Mistmantle Chronicles, was published by Bloomsbury Publishing in 2005.

Bibliography
The Mistmantle Chronicles Book 1 : Urchin of the Riding Stars
The Mistmantle Chronicles Book 2 : Urchin and the Heartstone
The Mistmantle Chronicles Book 3 : The Heir of Mistmantle
The Mistmantle Chronicles Book 4 : Urchin and the Raven War
The Mistmantle Chronicles Book 5: Urchin and the Rage Tide
The Life Shop
A Friend for Rachel
Hold My Hand and Run
Ghost at the Window
The Octave of Angels
Never Wash Your Hair
The Worst of the Vikings
The Mean Dream Wander Machine
The Doughnut Dilemma
Winner
My Guinea Pig is Innocent
Snow Troll
Black Death
Threads of Deceit

References

1956 births
Living people
English children's writers